Commander Frank Ragan King (October 15, 1884 – July 12, 1919)  was an officer in the United States Navy who died while conducting minesweeping operations shortly after World War I.

Biography
Born in Montevallo, Alabama, King was appointed midshipman at the Naval Academy 6 May 1903 and graduated February 11, 1907. After serving as a passed midshipman, he was commissioned Ensign February 12, 1909.

King served in Arkansas, Milwaukee, Pennsylvania, and Illinois before attaining the rank of Commander September 21, 1918.

Comdr. King assumed command of the trawler  July 7, 1919, during minesweeping operations in the North Sea.  On July 12, 1919, his ship struck a mine and went down in only seven minutes.

During the crisis, King exerted himself to see that all of his crew might be saved. King's feeling for his men was evidenced by the fact that his final act before going down with his ship was to strap his own life preserver to a stunned sailor and help him over the side. Comdr. King received the Distinguished Service Medal for his valor.

USS Richard Buckley
Commander Frank Ragan King assumed command of the trawler Richard Buckley July 7, 1919 during minesweeping operations in the North Sea.  On July 12, 1919, his ship struck a mine and went down in only seven minutes. During the crisis, King exerted himself to see that all of his crew might be saved. King's feeling for his men was evidenced by the fact that his final act before going down with his ship was to strap his own life preserver to a stunned sailor and help him over the side. Commander King received the Distinguished Service Medal for his valor.

Namesake
The destroyer USS King (DD-242) was named for him.

Bibliography 
Notes

References  
 - Total pages: 249 

1884 births
1919 deaths
People from Montevallo, Alabama
United States Navy personnel of World War I
United States Naval Academy alumni
United States Navy officers
Recipients of the Navy Distinguished Service Medal